The Troublemakers is a graphic novel by American cartoonist Gilbert Hernandez, published in 2009.  It is one of a number of stand-alone graphic novels featuring Hernandez's character Fritz acting in stories inspired by pulp fiction and exploitation movies.  Fritz plays a magician's assistant named Nala.

Background

The lead character in The Troublemakers is Rosalba "Fritz" Martinez, the half-sister of Hernandez's character Luba.  Fritz similarly starred in Speak of the Devil (2008), which is presented as the true story behind a movie.  Hernandez drew inspiration from pulp fiction and heist films such as It's a Mad, Mad, Mad, Mad World (1960) and A Simple Plan (1998).

Synopsis

The musician and con-man Wes tries to steal $ from his friend Dewy Booth to start a rock-and-roll club.  He gets his former babysitter, the stage magician Nala, to help him.  Vincene, a woman from Wes's past who is also a criminal, gets involved; soon Wes comes to question the motives of those around him.

References

Works cited

 
 

2013 graphic novels
American graphic novels
Gilbert Hernandez